Abish Ahmad Rural District is in Abish Ahmad District of Kaleybar County, East Azerbaijan province, Iran. At the National Census of 2006, its population was 11,989 in 2,536 households. There were 11,585 inhabitants in 2,760 households at the following census of 2011. At the most recent census of 2016, the population of the rural district was 11,531 in 3,253 households. The largest of its 46 villages was Najaf-e Tarakomeh, with 1,405 people.

References 

Kaleybar County

Rural Districts of East Azerbaijan Province

Populated places in East Azerbaijan Province

Populated places in Kaleybar County